In Asian art a lotus throne, sometimes lotus platform, is a stylized lotus flower used as the seat or base for a figure.  It is the normal pedestal for divine figures in Buddhist art and Hindu art, and often seen in Jain art.  Originating in Indian art, it followed Indian religions to East Asia in particular.

The precise form varies, but is intended to represent the opening flower of Nelumbo nucifera, the Indian lotus. In the traditional biographies lotus flowers sprung up at the Buddha's first seven steps, and in some Buddhist legends the baby Padmasambhava emerged from a lotus flower.  The Indian lotus is an aquatic plant similar to a water lily, though not actually any close relation.  It has a large, round, and flat seed head in the centre of the flower, with initially small openings above each of the relatively small number of seeds.  Among other unusual characteristics, nelumbo nucifera has particular properties of repelling water, known as the lotus effect or ultrahydrophobicity. Among other symbolic meanings, it rises above the water environment it lives in, and is not contaminated by it, so providing a model for Buddhists.  According to the Pali Canon, the Buddha himself began this often-repeated metaphor, in the Aṅguttara Nikāya, saying that the lotus flower raises from the muddy water unstained, as he raises from this world, free from the defilements taught in the sutra.

In Sanskrit the throne is called either a padmāsana (āsana is the name for a seated position), which is also the name for the Lotus position in meditation and yoga, or padmapitha, padma meaning lotus and pitha a base or plinth.

The Indian Saint Thomas Christians also use it in art as a base for the Saint Thomas Christian cross, also called the Persian cross, as do the Church of the East in China for the Nestorian cross.

History
The earliest of the Vedas, the Rigveda, describes the other gods watching the birth of Agni, the god of fire, seated on lotus flowers; also the birth of Vasishtha.  In Hindu myth, the major deity Brahma emerged from a lotus growing from the navel of Vishnu. 

 
In art the form is first seen as a base for rare early images of Laxmi from the 2nd century BCE; many or most of these may have a Buddhist context.  However it first becomes common with seated Buddha figures in the Greco-Buddhist art of Gandhara around the late 2nd or the 3rd century CE.  It may have reached the Deccan as early as the end of the 2nd century.  At some point, probably around 200, and before his death in about 250, the Buddhist thinker Nagarjuna exhorted an unknown Buddhist monarch, very probably in the Deccan, to:
... Please construct from all precious substances 
Images of Buddha with fine proportions
Well designed and sitting on lotuses ...

– suggesting this iconography was current by then. It is not clear from the language whether sculptures or paintings, or both, were meant.

In early Buddhist art it may be intended to specifically depict the second of the Twin Miracles in the legend of the Buddha's life. In some accounts of this, when engaged in a contest with sorcerers, the Buddha multiplied himself into other bodies, which sat or stood on lotus flowers. It became used for other Buddhist figures, and adopted for other Hindu deities than Laxmi.

Form
The throne in art evolved to be rather distant from the actual plant.  In historic sculpture there is very often a clear dividing line about halfway up; this type is called a "double-lotus" (vishvapadma) pedestal or throne.  Most often petal shapes both rise and fall from the dividing line, but sometimes the upper part of the throne represents the prominent flat-topped seed head as a base for the figure, perhaps with circles for the holes holding the seeds, as in maturing lotus heads.  The bingdi lotus is a particular strain with two back-to-back flowers on each stem, but it is not clear if this influenced the form in art.  In East Asian paintings, and also modern Hindu paintings, the lotus throne is often depicted more realistically in terms of its shape (though obviously not its size).

Representing the whole plant

The vast majority of lotus thrones just depict an isolated flower, or a group of flowers under different figures. But some images depict more of the plant. A famous relief of Gaja-Laxmi in Cave 16 at Ellora shows a pond of lotus leaves and budding flowers as a vertical panel below the throne.

Other compositions show stalks, buds and flowers reaching up beside a main figure. These may terminate in a flower held by the main figure, especially if it is Avalokitesvara or from the 5th or 6th century Vishnu, (both also having the epithet Padmapani, "lotus holder"), or in another lotus throne behind the hand, if it is outstretched in a mudra.  Alternatively, stalks may climb up to support lotus thrones underneath minor, smaller, figures, as in the early terracotta plaque illustrated above, where stalks rise at the side to support the elephants lustrating Gaja-Laxmi. This is seen in the 1st century BCE terracotta plaque illustrated above.  The Sanchi stone relief illustrated here shows a similar composition with Queen Maya, mother of the Buddha.  Above or below the water, the stems may be supported by small naga figures.

The lotus plant in lotus thrones is often imagined as growing out of the cosmic ocean, and a few images represent the plant below the water level, with a stem also representing the world axis.

Notes

References

Coomaraswamy, Ananda, Elements of Buddhist Iconography, Harvard University Press, 1935, online text
Jansen, Eva Rudy, The Book of Hindu Imagery: The Gods and their Symbols, 1993, Binkey Kok Publications, 9789074597074, google books
Krishan, Yuvrajmm, Tadikonda, Kalpana K., The Buddha Image: Its Origin and Development, 1996, Bharatiya Vidya Bhavan, 9788121505659,  google books 
Lerner, Martin and Kossak, Steven, The Lotus Transcendent: Indian and Southeast Asian Art from the Samuel Eilenberg Collection, 1991, Metropolitan Museum of Art (New York, N.Y.), 9780870996139, google books
Michell, George (1990), The Penguin Guide to the Monuments of India, Volume 1: Buddhist, Jain, Hindu, 1990, Penguin Books, 
Moore, Albert C., Klein, Charlotte, Iconography of Religions: An Introduction, 1977, Chris Robertson, 9780800604882, google books
Pal, Pratapaditya, Indian Sculpture: Circa 500 B.C.-A.D. 700, Volume 1 of Indian Sculpture: A Catalogue of the Los Angeles County Museum of Art Collection, 1986, Los Angeles County Museum of Art/University of California Press, 9780520059917, google books
Rodrigues, H, "The Sacred Lotus Symbol", Mahavidya, 2016 
Walser, Joseph, Nagarjuna in Context: Mahayana Buddhism and Early Indian Culture, 2005, Columbia University Press, 9780231506236, google books

Buddhist iconography
Hindu iconography
Indian art
Jain iconography
Plants in art
Flowers in religion